Higuera de Llerena is a municipality located in the province of Badajoz, Extremadura, Spain. According to the 2005 census (INE), the municipality has a population of 392 inhabitants.

History

In 1594, the census population of the provinces, and parties of the Crown of Castile of the 16th century were part of the state Lion of the Order of Santiago. It was a village of Llerena, with Cantalgayo and Maguilla.

Consolidation
In the fall of the Ancient Regime of the town, then known as Higuera, constitutes township in the region of Extremadura. From 1834, it became part of the judiciary party of Llerena. In the census of 1842 counted 66 households and 275 residents.

Tourism

Monuments and attractions
 Church Our Lady of the Valley. (16th century)
 Of the Calvary Chapel of Christ.
 Ermita de San Isidro. In the hamlet of Rubiales. Recently restored by the Ministry of Development.
 Archaeological site of Mesilla, yet to be excavated.

Local events
 Feast of San Isidro (May 15). In the hamlet of Los Rubiales
 Migrant Party (August)
 Virgin Our Lady of the Valley (festival, September 8)

References

Municipalities in the Province of Badajoz